The 1994 European Weightlifting Championships were held in Sokolov, Czech Republic from May 9 to May 15, 1994. It was the 73rd edition of the men's event. There were a total number of 162 athletes competing, from 29 nations. The women competition were held in Rome, Italy. It was the 7th event for the women.

Medal overview

Men

Medals tables 

Ranking by "Big" (Total result) medals

References
Weightlifting Database

European Weightlifting Championships
European Weightlifting Championships
European Weightlifting Championships
International sports competitions hosted by the Czech Republic
Weightlifting in the Czech Republic
May 1994 sports events in Europe